Insecticidal is a 2005 Canadian comedy horror film directed by Jeffery Scott Lando. In the film, a college student performs experiments on insects until a housemate tries to kill them. The insects grow to huge sizes and turn the sorority house into a nest, trying to kill the residents.

Plot

Cast
In order of appearance:
Meghan Heffern - Cami
Rhonda Dent - Josi
Samantha McLeod - Sophi
Shawn Bachynski - Martin
Vicky Huang - Fumi
Travis Watters - Mitch
Anna Amoroso - Jenni
Natalia Tudge - Twisti (as Natalia Walker)
Ryan Zwick - Dick
Nelson Carter Leis - Kyle
Anna Farrant - Belli
Chris Guy - Cherri
Alan Steele - Pizza Boy
Sean Whale - Sluggo
Simon Sippola - Security Guard (voice)

Release
Insecticidal was released on DVD by Hart Sharp Video on June 20, 2006. Hart Video later re-released the film as a part of a 4-disk Gore Pack Box Set.

Reception

Felix Vasquez from Cinema Crazed.com gave the film a mostly positive review, commending the film's strong performances, writing, "Jeffery Lando’s monster mash is firmly entrenched in the schlock arena, it’s a guiltless and shameless piece of exploitation that is so based around the sexy female cast, even the bugs want to strip them naked and mount them." Popcorn Pictures awarded the film a score of 6/10, writing, "A guilty pleasure if there was one, Insecticidal is the silly tonic fans need to down after they’ve sat through the never-ending dreck that the Sci-Fi Channel has been churning out lately. Now who wants to fund me a couple of grand to make Babes Versus Bugs?"

References

External links
 
 
 
 

2005 films
2005 horror films
2005 comedy horror films
2000s English-language films
Films about insects
Incest in film
Films about size change
Canadian comedy horror films
English-language Canadian films
2005 comedy films
Films directed by Jeffery Scott Lando
2000s Canadian films